Muhammad ibn Abd al-Rahman ibn Mu'awiyah ibn Hudayj al-Tujibi (died September 772) was a governor of Egypt for the Abbasid Caliphate for a portion of 772.

Career
Muhammad was a member of a leading Arab Egyptian family during the early Islamic era, being the son of Abd al-Rahman ibn Mu'awiyah ibn Hudayj al-Tujibi and grandson to Mu'awiyah ibn Hudayj al-Tujibi. His brother Abdallah was a chief of security (shurtah) for Egypt and later served as governor of the province from 769 to 772.

In the history of al-Kindi, Muhammad first appears just after the arrival of the Abbasid Revolution to Egypt in 750, when he was one of several local notables who presented themselves to the new Abbasid governor Salih ibn Ali. In 767 he participated in a failed campaign to suppress a Coptic and Arab revolt at Sakha and was seriously wounded in the fighting. In 771 he was temporarily placed in charge of Egypt when Abdallah departed to visit the caliph al-Mansur in Iraq.

Following the death of Abdallah in 772, Muhammad took over and succeeded him in the governorship, and he shortly afterwards received a formal appointment from al-Mansur confirming him in that position. After a few months in office, he died of an illness and was replaced with Musa ibn Ulayy ibn Rabah al-Lakhmi.

Notes

References
 

 
 

772 deaths
8th-century Abbasid governors of Egypt
Abbasid governors of Egypt
8th-century Arabs